Elections to Gateshead Council in Tyne and Wear, England were held on 6 May 1999. One third of the council was up for election and the Labour Party kept overall control of the council. The results saw the Liberal Democrats gain 2 seats from Labour but Labour gained one seat in Blaydon. Overall turnout was 26.4%.

After the election, the composition of the council was:
Labour 49
Liberal Democrat 15
Liberal 1
Other 1

Election result

References

1999 English local elections
1999
20th century in Tyne and Wear